In 1800, there were two special elections for the U.S. Senate from New York:

 April 1800 United States Senate special election in New York
 November 1800 United States Senate special election in New York